Jerry Marquis (born February 14, 1956) is a former NASCAR Driver who competed in the NASCAR Busch Series the NASCAR Craftsman Truck Series, The NASCAR Busch North Series and The NASCAR Featherlight Modified Series. He is from Broad Brook, Connecticut.

Marquis has won 7 NASCAR Busch North Series races putting him 16th on the all-time list in the Busch North Series. His home track was Stafford Motor Speedway. Jerry Marquis was also infamous for NASCAR's former commentator Bill Weber and the "bodyguard to the stars" incident. He spun out Tony Stewart who was racing a NASCAR Modified race car that day with five laps to go and when the race was over a personal friend was pulled away by Weber and was to do an interview. Marquis declined to comment.

Marquis also raced in two Busch series races for Mike Greci in the number 51 Wheels Discount Auto Chevy at Loudon and at Nazareth. He also raced in the 18 DANA Corp Truck at Richmond in 1997 driving for Kurt Roehrig. He is most notable for winning the 2000 NASCAR Winston Modified Tour Championship with sponsorship from LongView RV and Teddy Bear Pools. He won at Riverhead, Seeknook, Thompson, Waterford, and Stafford Springs.

Motorsports career results

NASCAR
(key) (Bold – Pole position awarded by qualifying time. Italics – Pole position earned by points standings or practice time. * – Most laps led.)

Busch Series

Craftsman Truck Series

 Competed only in companion events with Busch North Series as BNS driver and ineligible for Busch Series points

References

External links

Living people
1956 births
People from East Windsor, Connecticut